Daria Hennadiyivna Bilodid (born 10 October 2000) is a Ukrainian judoka. She is the 2019 World and the 2019 European gold medalist in the 48 kg division. In 2021, she won one of the bronze medals in the women's 48 kg event at the 2020 Summer Olympics in Tokyo, Japan.

Career
Her father is fellow (successful) judoka Gennadiy Bilodid.

Bilodid won her first ever world title and in the process, she broke the record for becoming the youngest ever judo world champion at the age of 17. She defeated former opponents: the former Olympic and world bronze medalist, Galbadrakhyn Otgontsetseg by ippon; former Olympic champion and world champion, Paula Pareto of Argentina in the semi-finals by waza-ari; in the finals, she faced Paris Grand Slam final opponent, Funa Tonaki whom she defeated by her signature ouchi gari for ippon at 1:59 of the contest, winning gold at the 2018 World Judo Championships in Baku, Azerbaijan. She is the youngest two-time world judo champion among both men and women.

In 2021, she won one of the bronze medals in her event at the 2021 Judo World Masters held in Doha, Qatar. A month later, she won the silver medal in her event at the 2021 Judo Grand Slam Tel Aviv held in Tel Aviv, Israel.

Bilodid won her first bronze Olympic on the 2020 Summer Olympics, as she beat the Israeli judoka Shira Rishony. This medal was Ukraine's first Olympic medal for women's judo.

Medal results

2017
 Grand Prix, Hohhot
 Grand Prix, The Hague

2018
 Grand Prix, Tunis
 Grand Slam, Paris
 Grand Slam, Düsseldorf
 Grand Prix, Zagreb
 Continental Cup, Podčetrtek
 World Championship, Baku

2019
 World Championship, Tokyo
 Grand Slam, Abu Dhabi

2020
 Grand Slam, Paris

2021
 Olympic Games, Tokyo

References

External links

 
 
 
 

2000 births
Ukrainian female judoka
Living people
World judo champions
Sportspeople from Kyiv
European Games medalists in judo
European Games gold medalists for Ukraine
Judoka at the 2019 European Games
Judoka at the 2020 Summer Olympics
Medalists at the 2020 Summer Olympics
Olympic bronze medalists for Ukraine
Olympic medalists in judo
Olympic judoka of Ukraine
21st-century Ukrainian women